Splid (Norwegian for "discord") is the fourth studio album by Norwegian heavy metal band Kvelertak, released on 14 February 2020. The album was recorded in GodCity Studios in Salem, Massachusetts, United States. It is the band's first album with vocalist Ivar Nikolaisen and drummer Håvard Takle Ohr.

Release
On 27 November 2019, the first single "Bråtebrann" was released, along with the announcement of the album.

Critical reception
Splid was met with "universal acclaim" from critics. At Metacritic, which assigns a weighted average rating out of 100 to reviews from mainstream publications, it received an average score of 84 based on six reviews. At AnyDecentMusic?, the release was given a 7.7 out of 10.

James Christopher Monger of AllMusic spoke on the change of the lead vocals: "The installation of a new lead singer can be fraught with danger, but Kvelertak's chassis has always been the sublime triple-guitar attack of Vidar Landa, Bjarte Lund Rolland, and Maciek Ofsad, which is set to full-on slay for album number four. Ivar Nikolaisen's first stint behind the wheel feels less like a sea change and more like a subtle changing of the guard." Michael Pementel from Consequence of Sound wrote "Over its 11 tracks, Splid consistently churns out raging banger after banger, allowing for the record to roar with metal bliss. The creativity expressed in Splid is matched by its intensity, as Kvelertak embrace the metal spirit throughout the album."

Year-end lists

Track listing

Personnel 
Credits were adapted from the album's liner notes.

Kvelertak
Vidar Landa – guitar, vocals
Bjarte Lund Rolland – guitar, piano, saxophone, vocals
Marvin Nygaard – bass, percussion, vocals
Maciek Ofstad – lead guitar, vocals
Ivar Nikolaisen – lead vocals
Håvard Takle Ohr – drums

Guest musicians 
Troy Sanders – vocals on "Crack of Doom"
Nate Newton – vocals on "Discord"

Production
Kurt Ballou – producer, recorded by, mixed by
Alan Douches – mastering
Zach Weeks – recorded by

Charts

References 

 

2020 albums
Kvelertak albums
Norwegian-language albums
Rise Records albums